Ananda Bashpa is a 1963 Indian Kannada-language film, directed and produced by R. Nagendra Rao. The film stars R. N. Sudarshan, K. S. Ashwath, Harini and Rajani. The film had musical score by G. K. Venkatesh.

Plot

Cast
R. N. Sudarshan
K. S. Ashwath
Harini
Rajani
R. Nagendra Rao

References

External links
 

1963 films
1960s Kannada-language films
Films scored by G. K. Venkatesh